Hangzhou South railway station is a railway station located in the Xiaoshan District, Hangzhou, Zhejiang Province, China.

History
Xiaoshan railway station opened in 1992. Xiaoshan station was renamed Hangzhou South station on January 1, 2010. The station closed for renovation work on July 1, 2013 when Hangzhou East railway station opened. The metro station on the newly built Metro Line 5, which connects the railway station with Xiaoshan District, downtown, northern and western Hangzhou, opened on June 30, 2020. The rebuilt railway station reopened on July 1, 2020.

Gallery

Hangzhou Metro

South Railway Station is a metro station on Line 5 of the Hangzhou Metro in China. It is located in the Xiaoshan District of Hangzhou and it serves Hangzhou South railway station.

See also 
Hangzhou railway station
Hangzhou East railway station
Hangzhou Metro

References

Railway stations in China opened in 1992
Railway stations in Zhejiang
Stations on the Shanghai–Kunming Railway
Hangzhou Metro stations